The list of shipwrecks in 2023 includes ships sunk, foundered, grounded, or otherwise lost during 2023.

January

3 January

4 January

7 January

10 January

15 January

16 January

18 January

19 January

20 January

22 January

24 January

25 January

26 January

28 January

31 January

February

3 February

4 February

5 February

11 February

16 February

18 February

20 February

21 February

22 February

23 February

28 February

March

9 March

11 March

15 March

References

Shipwrecks
2022